Jasmine Jamila Baroudi (born September 16) is a Ghanaian actress. She studied Psychology at the University of Ghana where she graduated.

Career
She was featured in the Ghanaian TV Series, Adam's Apples (2011 - 2012) and acted alongside Ghallywood actors and actresses such as Majid Michel. She was later nominated in the Best Discovery category at the 2011 Ghana Movie Awards for this TV Series.

In 2014, she starred in the film directed by Mikki Osei-Berko titled, Broken Mirror, also featuring Jackie Appiah, James Gardiner, Fred Amugi and Roselyn Ngissah, and produced by David Owusu.

Between 2014 and 2015, she was featured as Tilly Walsh in the Shirley Frimpong-Manso-directed Television Series, V-Republic. Other stars include: Nikki Samonas, Joselyn Dumas and Christabel Ekeh.

She was nominated in the 2014 Ghana Movie Awards in the Best TV Series Actress category, for the TV Series, Heart Break Hotel on TV3 Ghana.

She was the winner in the Best Supporting Actress - Drama category of the 2019 Golden Movie Awards (GMA). She starred in the film, The Cell, in the same year.

She was starred in the 2019 film, A New Flame. Other Ghanaian stars featured include: Richard Asante (Kalyboss) and Edinam Atatsi.

Filmography

Accolades

Controversies
Baroudi issued stern warnings to men who she threaten to "name and shame" who sent her pictures of their manhood online, viewing it as an act of cyber bullying.

Graphic Showbizz reported her stating that the use of unprofessional actors who are so many make the film industry not to grow, recommending that producers only put those qualified on the screen.

Personal life
She is married to Williams Ofori Atta.

References

External links
 Jasmine Baroudi on IMDb
 Jasmine Baroudi on IrokoTV
 Jasmine Baroudi on Shurume
 Jasmine Baroudi on MyBioHub

Ghanaian actresses
University of Ghana alumni
Living people

Year of birth missing (living people)